The Ticket of Leave Man is a 1937 British thriller film directed by George King and starring Tod Slaughter, John Warwick and Marjorie Taylor. It was based on The Ticket-of-Leave Man, an 1863 melodrama by Tom Taylor which introduced the character Hawkshaw the Detective. It takes its name from the Ticket of leave which was issued to convicts when they were released.

Plot

A man is wrongly accused of a series of killings, leaving him to hunt the real murderer.

Cast 
Tod Slaughter as The Tiger
John Warwick as Robert Brierly
Marjorie Taylor as May Edwards
Frank Cochran as Melter Moss
Robert Adair as Hawkshaw the Detective
Peter Gawthorne as Joshua Gibson
Jenny Lynn as Mrs. Willoughby
Arthur West Payne as Sam Willoughby
Norman Pierce as Maltby
Billy Bray as Jackson

Soundtrack

References

External links 

1937 films
1930s thriller films
British black-and-white films
Films directed by George King
Films scored by Jack Beaver
British thriller films
1930s English-language films
1930s British films